Tumleo may refer to:

Tumleo Island in Sandaun Province, Papua New Guinea
Tumleo language, an Austronesian language spoken in Papua New Guinea